Richard Hooper (born 26 August 1956) is a former long-distance runner from Raheny, Dublin, Ireland.

Career
He represented Ireland in the Olympic marathon in Moscow 1980, Los Angeles 1984 and Seoul 1988. He also represented Ireland four times in the European Championships - in Czechoslovakia 1978, Athens 1982, Stuttgart 1986 and Split 1990.

He is a three-time record-holding winner of the Dublin Marathon in 1980, 1985 and 1988 and he set his personal best time at the 1988 Irish National Championship in Wexford, clocking 2:12:19 finishing in 2nd place behind John Woods.  He went on to win a record six national marathon championships winning his last in 1998 at the age of 42.

He is the younger brother of marathoner Pat Hooper, and, having had a career in banking, also worked as a coach, and an athletics commentator on Setanta Sports and Irish TV.

Achievements
All results regarding marathon, unless stated otherwise

References

1956 births
Living people
Irish male long-distance runners
Athletes (track and field) at the 1980 Summer Olympics
Athletes (track and field) at the 1984 Summer Olympics
Athletes (track and field) at the 1988 Summer Olympics
Olympic athletes of Ireland
People educated at St Paul's College, Raheny